Genes, Brain and Behavior (also known as G2B) is a peer-reviewed online-only scientific journal covering research in the fields of behavioral, neural, and psychiatric genetics. It is published by Wiley-Blackwell on behalf of the International Behavioural and Neural Genetics Society. The journal was established in 2002 as a quarterly and is currently published monthly. G2B is a hybrid open access journal, but two years after publication all content is available for free online.

Overview and history 
Genes, Brain and Behavior is published by Wiley-Blackwell on behalf of the International Behavioural and Neural Genetics Society. Volume 1 appeared in 2002 and issues appeared quarterly. As submissions increased, the journal switched in 2003 to a bimonthly schedule, in 2006 to 8-times-a-year, and in 2014 to a monthly frequency. Content is available online from the Wiley Online Library or, after a 12-month embargo, from EBSCOhost. Authors can elect to have accepted articles published as open access. All content is available online for free 24 months after publication. The journal was originally published in both print and electronic versions, but since 2014 the journal is online-only.

The founding editor-in-chief was Wim Crusio (French National Centre for Scientific Research), who was succeeded in 2012 by Andrew Holmes (National Institute on Alcohol Abuse and Alcoholism).

Reception 
In its third year, Genes, Brain and Behavior was available in 1400 academic libraries. According to the Journal Citation Reports, its 2020 impact factor is 3.449, ranking the journal 152nd out of 273 journals in the category "Neurosciences" and 16th out of 53 journals in the category "Behavioral Sciences".

The five journals that  have cited Genes, Brain and Behavior most often, are (in order of descending citation frequency) PLoS ONE, Genes, Brain and Behavior, Scientific Reports, Neuroscience & Biobehavioral Reviews, and Behavioural Brain Research. , the five journals that have been cited most frequently by articles published in Genes, Brain and Behavior are The Journal of Neuroscience, Proceedings of the National Academy of Sciences, Nature, Science, and Neuron.

The journal has developed standards for the publication of mouse mutant studies. Many mouse mutant studies have serious methodological problems leading to fatally flawed scientific conclusions, causing a waste of time, effort, and research resources, and leading to ethical problems because of the unnecessary use of live animals for flawed studies. These standards are gradually being accepted more widely in the field.

Abstracting and indexing
Genes, Brain and Behavior is abstracted and indexed in:

Most cited articles 
According to the Web of Science, the following three articles have been cited most often (>350 times):

See also

References

External links 

Behavioural genetics journals
Psychiatry journals
Publications established in 2002
English-language journals
Behavioral neuroscience
Wiley-Blackwell academic journals
Delayed open access journals
Hybrid open access journals
Monthly journals
Online-only journals
Neuroscience journals